Ahmed Hatem Abdellatef (born 2 September 1995) is an Egyptian basketball player for Zamalek and .

Professional career
Hatem was on the Zamalek roster for the 2021 BAL season, where he went on to win the first-ever BAL championship.

National team career
Hatem is a member of the Egyptian national basketball team and played his first games in the fall of 2020 during the 2021 AfroBasket qualifiers.

BAL career statistics

|-
|style="text-align:left;background:#afe6ba;"|2021†
|style="text-align:left;"|Zamalek
| 5 || 0 || 11.6 || .385 || .417 || 1.000 || .4 || 1.4 || .2 || .0 || 4.2
|- class="sortbottom"
| style="text-align:center;" colspan="2"|Career
| 5 || 0 || 11.6 || .385 || .417 || 1.000 || .4 || 1.4 || .2 || .0 || 4.2

External links
RealGM profile

References

1995 births
Living people
Egyptian men's basketball players
Shooting guards
Zamalek SC basketball players